Jean Pierre de Batz, Baron de Sainte-Croix, known as the Baron de Batz or de Bance, (26 January 1754 – 10 January 1822), was a French royalist and businessman. He was born in Goutz-les-Tartas (Gers), and died in Chadieu, near Vic-le-Comte (Puy-de-Dôme).

His life and actions in the service of Louis XVI inspired several popular novelists, including Baroness Orczy (Eldorado, 1913), Rafael Sabatini (Scaramouche, 1921) and more recently Juliette Benzoni (Le Jeu de l'amour et de la mort series, 1999–2000).

Biography

Royal agent
Under the Constituent Assembly, de Batz's reputation as a financier led to his 28 May 1790 appointment to the liquidation committee, which was responsible for clearing public accounts. It appears that de Batz conducted liquidations of fraudulent debts, sold to his friends who then reimbursed him. At the same time, he became a secret adviser to Louis XVI, and organized the financing of a secret policy implemented at the Chateau de Tuileries under Armand Marc, comte de Montmorin to defend the monarchy, which continued until at least 10 August 1792. On his own account, de Batz advanced to Louis XVI a sum exceeding 500,000 livres. His best ally was the Minister of Finance, Étienne Clavière, and under the guise of missions Clavière entrusted to him, de Batz made several voyages abroad between March 1792 and January 1793.

On January 21, 1793, de Batz tried in vain to raise the crowd in boulevard de Bonne Nouvelle to save the king from execution. Several royalists were killed, though de Batz managed to escape. He remained partially in hiding until he obtained a certificate of non-emigration in June 1793.

Accusations of conspiracies
At the end of October 1793, fraud was uncovered in the liquidation of the French East India Company, and de Batz was named as the leader of a vast conspiracy against the fledgeling republic. According to a declaration made in prison by François Chabot, de Batz had frequently met with leaders of the Paris Commune and the National Convention, including Committee of Public Safety members Claude Basire, Julien de Toulouse and Delaunay d'Angers. Chabot also asserted that de Batz had held talks with foreign bankers including Junius Frey and his brother Emmanuel Frey (of Austria), Pierre-Jean Berthold de Prosly (of Brussels) (fr), Andres Maria de Guzman (of Spain), and Jacob Pereira (of Portugal). However, this de Batz plot was itself a conspiracy, a political-police operation which concentrated the attention of the Jacobins on the alleged dangers of de Batz and his accomplices to the Convention, with the aim of dissolving it.

At the time, de Batz was constantly traveling between the provinces and Switzerland, and learned that his friends and most of his relations had been arrested. Denunciations were gathered to build an indictment and support the imaginary conspiracy. On 14 March 1794, Hébertistes, Clootz, Pereira and Prosly were guillotined. On April 5, Georges Danton and his friends were executed with Chabot, Basire, the abbot of Espagnac, Guzman, and the Frey brothers.

Police files and de Batz's passport would later exonerate him, as de Batz was not in Paris at the time of the liquidation.

After the Reign of Terror
Returning to France, de Batz was involved in the royalist insurrection of 5 October 1795, and imprisoned.  After the Coup of 18 Fructidor (4 September 1797), he took refuge in Auvergne where he owned a castle. Discovered, he was arrested, but escaped during his transfer to Lyon and fled to Switzerland. The French Consulate had him removed from the list of emigrants and he abandoned political activism, returning to live in Auvergne.

Under the Bourbon Restoration, he was awarded the rank of maréchal de camp (field marshal) and the cross of St. Louis for his services, as well as the military command of Cantal, which was revoked after the Hundred Days period.

Living in seclusion in Chadieu, near Vic-le-Comte, he died on 10 January 1822.

Literary representations 
The character of the double agent, a supporter of the monarchy and member of a network of Royalist agents in France and abroad whilst masquerading as a staunch Republican, is a stock character in literature set during the French Revolution.  Through his activities, this character sends many revolutionaries to the guillotine, having them convicted of being anti-revolutionaries. Fictionalizations of de Batz appear in several novels:
Jean de Batz is the hero of a series of novels by Juliette Benzoni, The Game of Love and Death.
The Baron de Batz appears in a few of The Scarlet Pimpernel series of books by Baroness Orczy, playing the most prominent role in Eldorado.
He also appears as a major character in Raphael Sabatini's novel, Scaramouche the Kingmaker, and a minor character in The Lost King.
Jean de Batz is a lead character in the historic fiction novel Seed of Mischief by Willa Gibbs, 1953. The book revolves around the Dauphin, Louis-Charles (1785–1795).
Baron de Batz appears in Dennis Wheatley’s “To Kill a King”, in the Roger Brook series. He serves as a colleague with a shared aim but also a foil to Brook’s attempts to rescue the Royal Family and reconcile with his wife.
There are also biographies of de Batz:
Marie Antoinette's henchman – the carrier of Jean de Batz, in french revolution by Meade Minnigerode (1936)
A Gascon Royalist in revolutionary Paris by Rodolph Stawell, reprinted from "Forgotten books".

Sources 

Roger Dupuy, "Jean, baron de Batz", in albert Soboul (dir.), Dictionnaire historique de la Révolution française, Paris, PUF, 1989 (rééd. Quadrige, 2005, p. 96–97)
Noëlle Destremau, Le baron de Batz un étonnant Conspirateur, Nouvelles Editions Latines.
G. Lenotre, Le baron de Batz, Librairie académique Perrin et Cie
Baron de Batz, La vie et les conspirations de Jean, Baron de Batz, 1754–1793, Les conspirations et la fin de Jean, Baron de Batz, 1793-1822, Calmann-Lévy, 1910–1911.

1754 births
1822 deaths
People from Gers
French businesspeople